Kidner is a surname. Notable people with the surname include:

David Kidner (born 1982), English cricketer
Derek Kidner (1913–2008), English Anglican priest and biblical scholar
Michael Kidner (1917–2009), British artist
Roger Kidner (1914–2007), English railway historian
Thomas B. Kidner (1866–1932), English occupational therapist